The 2016–17 Penn State Nittany Lions basketball team represented Pennsylvania State University in the 2016–17 NCAA Division I men's basketball season. They were led by head coach Pat Chambers, in his sixth season with the team. They played their home games at the Bryce Jordan Center in University Park, Pennsylvania and were members of the Big Ten Conference. They finished the season 15–18, 6–12 in Big Ten play to finish in a tie for 12th place. As the No. 13 seed in the Big Ten tournament, they beat Nebraska in the first round before losing to Michigan State in the second round.

Previous season
The Nittany Lions finished the 2015–16 season with a record of 16–16, 7–11 in Big Ten play to finish in tenth place in conference. They lost to Ohio State in the second round of the Big Ten tournament.

Offseason

Departures

Incoming transfers

2016 recruiting class

Personnel

Roster

Coaching Staff

Schedule and results

|-
!colspan=9 style=|  Exhibition

|-
!colspan=9 style=|  Non-conference regular season

|-
!colspan=9 style=|Big Ten regular season

|-
!colspan=9 style=|Big Ten tournament

Source

References

Penn State Nittany Lions basketball seasons
Penn State
Penn State
Penn State